Noorita binti Sual (born 1980) is a Malaysian politician who was the Member of Parliament (MP) for Tenom from May 2018 to 2022. She is a member of the Democratic Action Party (DAP), a component party of the Pakatan Harapan (PH) opposition coalition.

Elections

2018 general election 
In the 2018 election, her party of Democratic Action Party (DAP) field her to contest the Tenom parliamentary seat to facing a new candidate Rubin Balang from the United Malays National Organisation (UMNO). She subsequently won the seat, breaking a long time rule by the Barisan Nasional (BN) in the area.

Election results

References

External links 
 

Living people
1980 births
People from Sabah
Murut people
Women in Sabah politics
Women members of the Dewan Rakyat
Members of the Dewan Rakyat
Democratic Action Party (Malaysia) politicians